A sports rivalry is intense competition between athletic teams or athletes, affecting participants, management, and supporters all to varying degrees.

The intensity of the rivalry can range anywhere from a light hearted banter to serious violence. A rivalry that gets out of control can lead to fighting, hooliganism, rioting and some instances with career-ending and even fatal consequences. In the "Football War", along with other factors, it was suggested to have been the tipping point in leading to military conflicts.

Owners have been known to encourage rivalries as they tend to improve game attendance and television ratings for rivalry matches. Clubs can reduce fan aggression surrounding rivalry games by acknowledging rather than downplaying the conflict because the rivalry is an integral part of fan identity.

Games between two rivals that are based in areas of close geographical proximity are often known as a local derby, or simply just a derby; a sporting event between two teams from the same town, city or region. The term is usually connected with association football and the media and supporters will often refer to this fixture as "Derby Day".

The term "derby" possibly originated from the Derby, a horse race in England, founded by the 12th Earl of Derby in 1780. The 19th Earl has since claimed the Derby name was originally only given to one other sporting event: fixtures between St Helens at one end of the family's Knowsley estate and Wigan at the other.

The other theory as to the name's origin involves Shrovetide football, an early, unofficiated version of both association and rugby football. It was first played in the town of Derby prior to Medieval times. From as early as the 12th century it was known to have been played in Ashbourne. It was a chaotic and exuberant affair that involved the whole town, often resulting in fatalities. The goals were at Nuns Mill in the north and the Gallows Balk in the south of the town, and much of the action took place in the River Derwent or the Markeaton Brook. Nominally the players came from All Saints' and St Peter's parishes, but in practice the game was a free-for-all with as many as 1,000 players. A Frenchman who observed a match in 1829 wrote in horror, 'if Englishmen call this play, it would be impossible to say what they call fighting'. Shrovetide football is still an annual event in the town of Ashbourne.

Since at least as early as 1840 'derby' has been used as a noun in English to denote any kind of sporting contest. Other names for derbies include Clásicos in certain parts of the world and crosstown rivalries in the United States.

Rivalries do not always stem from the sharing of an area. Hostilities can occur for different reasons, such as in the case of El Clásico with tensions between fans with a background of historically cultural and political differences. Frequent meetings in important games between teams can also lead to unpleasantries.

International rivalries
 Australia–England sports rivalries
India–Pakistan sports rivalries
 Australia–New Zealand sports rivalries
 Canada–United States sports rivalries
 Japan–South Korea sports rivalries
 Indonesia-Malaysia sports rivalries

Association football

Athletics

Individual

Team

Australian rules football

Badminton

Bandy
In Swedish bandy, derby games are often played on Saint Stephen's Day.

Baseball

Dominican Republic

Dominican Professional Baseball League
 Santo Domingo rivals: Leones del Escogido vs. Tigres del Licey

Japan

Nippon Professional Baseball

Central League 
 Yomiuri Giants vs. Hanshin Tigers on a game named "The Classic Series" (伝統の一戦 in Japanese).
 Yomiuri Giants vs. Tokyo Yakult Swallows on a game named "Tokyo Series".

Pacific League

South Korea

KBO League
 KIA Tigers vs. Samsung Lions on a game named "88 Expressway Series".
 Doosan Bears vs. LG Twins on a game named "Jamsil Series".
 Lotte Giants vs. NC Dinos on a game named "Nakdonggang Derby".
 Kiwoom Heroes vs. Doosan Bears or LG Twins on a game named "Seoul Series".

Taiwan

Chinese Professional Baseball League
 CTBC Brothers vs. Wei Chuan Dragons on a game named "Dragon-Elephant Derby" (龍象大戰 in Chinese).
 CTBC Brothers vs. Fubon Guardians on a game named "Bank holding Derby" (金控大戰 in Chinese).

Mexico

Mexican Baseball League
 Diablos Rojos del México (Mexico City Red Devils) vs. Tigres de Quintana Roo (Tigers) on a game named "Civil War Derby" ("Guerra Civil" in Spanish).
 Saraperos de Saltillo (Saltillo Sarapemaker's) vs. Vaqueros Laguna (Torreon Lagoon Cowboys) on a game named "Coahuila's Metropolitan Derby" ("Clásico metropolitano de Coahuila" in Spanish).
 Pericos de Puebla (Puebla Parrots) vs. Rojos del Águila de Veracruz (Veracruz Red Eagles) on a game named "Center rivalry" ("Rivalidad del centro" in Spanish).
 Diablos Rojos del México (Mexico City Red Devils) vs. Péricos de Puebla (Puebla Parrots) on a game named "Anahuac Derby" ("Clásico de Ánahuac" in Spanish).
 Saraperos de Saltillo (Saltillo Sarapemaker's) vs. Sultanes de Monterrey (Monterrey Sultans) on a game named "North of Mexico Derby" ("Clásico del Norte" in Spanish).

Mexican Pacific League
 Naranjeros de Hermosillo (Hermosillo Orange Growers) vs. Tomateros de Culiacán (Culiacan Tomato Growers) on a game named "Derby of the Pacific Coast" ("Clásico del Pacífico" in Spanish).
 Charros de Jalisco (Jalisco Charros) vs. Venados de Mazatlán (Mazatlan Deers) on a game named "Rivalry of the west" ("Rivalidad de Occidente" in Spanish).

United States/Canada

Major League Baseball

Minor League Baseball
 Mercer Cup: Bluefield Blue Jays vs. Princeton Rays

Venezuela

Venezuelan Professional Baseball League
 Leones del Caracas (Caracas Lions) vs. Navegantes del Magallanes (Magellan Navigators)
 Leones del Caracas (Caracas Lions) vs. Tiburones de La Guaira (La Guaira Sharks)

Basketball

Australia
 The Derby of Distance: Perth Wildcats vs New Zealand Breakers
 Although this rivalry is actually an international rivalry, it plays out within the Australia-based National Basketball League. The Breakers have been an NBL member from the league's formation.
 Melbourne United vs Sydney Kings

Croatia
 Croatian Derby: Cibona vs Split
 Classic derby: Cibona vs. Zadar

China 
 Northeastern Derby: Liaoning Flying Leopards vs Jilin Northeast Tigers
 Beijing Derby: Beijing Ducks vs Beijing Royal Fighters
 Chinese Classic: Beijing Ducks vs Guangdong Southern Tigers
Derby of Champions: Liaoning Flying Leopards vs Guangdong Southern Tigers
Battle of the Dynasties: Bayi Rockets vs Guangdong Southern Tigers
Guangdong Derby: Shenzhen Leopards vs Guangdong Southern Tigers
Xinjiang Flying Tigers vs Guangdong Southern Tigers
Guangdong has 11 CBA league titles, more than any other team in history, so it is very evident that they would have a lot of rivalries within the CBA.

France
 Le Classique: Pau-Orthez vs Limoges
 Greater Paris Derby: Nanterre vs Metropolitans 92
 Alsace-Lorraine Derby: Nancy vs Strasbourg

Germany
 German Classic: Alba Berlin vs Bayern Munich vs Brose Bamberg

Greece
 Derby of the eternal enemies: Panathinaikos vs. Olympiacos
 Derby of Northern Greece: Aris vs. PAOK

Hong Kong
These are active Hong Kong A1 rivalries:
 Derby of Classics: South China vs. Winling
 South-East Clash: Eastern vs. South China
 Winling-Eastern Rivalry: Winling vs. Eastern

These are high school sports rivalries, but are primarily contested in basketball:
 Diocesan Boys School vs. Ying Wa College

Israel
 Tel Aviv derby: Maccabi Tel Aviv vs. Hapoel Tel Aviv
 Derby of Israel: Maccabi Tel Aviv vs. Hapoel Jerusalem
 Tel Aviv vs. Haifa: Maccabi Tel Aviv or Hapoel Tel Aviv vs. Maccabi Haifa or Hapoel Haifa

Italy
 Bologna Derby: Fortitudo Bologna vs Virtus Bologna
 Lombardy Derby: Olimpia Milano vs Varese vs Cantù
 Veneto Derby: Treviso vs Reyer Venezia
 Rome Derby: Virtus Roma vs Stella Azzurra Roma
 Piedmont Derby: Auxilium Torino vs Biella vs Junior Casale
 Via Emilia Derby: Reggiana vs Fortitudo Bologna or Virtus Bologna

Japan

Korea Republic
 S-Derby: Seoul Samsung Thunders vs Seoul SK Knights
 Daegu Derby: Daegu KOGAS Pegasus vs Goyang Orion Orions

Lebanon
 Derby Beirut: Al Riyadi vs Sagesse

Lithuania
 Rytas vs Žalgiris

North Macedonia
 Skopje basketball derby: Rabotnički vs. MZT Skopje

Philippines
These are active Philippine Basketball Association rivalries:
 Manila Clasico: Magnolia vs. Barangay Ginebra
 Sibling Rivalry: San Miguel vs. Barangay Ginebra
 Barangay Ginebra vs Meralco
 TNT vs Barangay Ginebra
 Magnolia vs. Rain or Shine
These are active Maharlika Pilipinas Basketball League rivalries:
 San Juan vs. Davao Occidental

These are college sports rivalries, but are primarily contested in basketball:
 Ateneo vs. La Salle (The Ateneo–La Salle rivalry)
 San Beda vs. Letran (The San Beda–Letran rivalry)
 La Salle vs. UST (The La Salle–UST rivalry)
 The Battle of Intramuros: Letran vs. Mapua
 The Battle of the East/Morayta: FEU vs. UE
 San Beda vs. San Sebastian (The San Beda–San Sebastian rivalry)
 The Battle of Katipunan: Ateneo vs. UP
 Letran vs. San Sebastian (The Letran–San Sebastian rivalry)
 UC vs. UV

Poland

Russia
 Moscow derby: Khimki vs CSKA Moscow
 Moscow region derby: Khimki Moscow vs. Triumph Lyubertsy
 Volga derby: BC Nizhny Novgorod vs. BC Krasny Oktyabr

Slovenia
 Slovenian Classic: Krka vs Olimpija

Serbia
 Eternal Derby: Crvena zvezda vs. Partizan

Spain
 El Clásico: Barcelona vs. Real Madrid
 Basque derby: Baskonia vs. Bilbao, can also include GBC
 Canary Islands derby: Canarias vs Gran Canaria
 Madrid derby: Real Madrid vs Estudiantes
 Catalan derby: Joventut vs Barcelona
 Andalusian derby: Málaga vs Real Betis
 Galician derby: Obradoiro vs Breogán, can also include Ourense or Coruña

United Kingdom

United States and Canada

National Basketball Association

Individuals

Turkey
 Istanbul Derby: Galatasaray vs Fenerbahçe, can also include Darüşşafaka, Anadolu Efes, Istanbul BB and Beşiktaş
 Ankara Derby: Türk Telekom vs TED Ankara Kolejliler

Bobsleigh

Bodybuilding

Boxing

Individual

Team

Chess

College sport

Cricket

International

Domestic

Cue sports

Curling

Cycling

Darts

Diving

Esports

Field hockey

Figure skating

Golf

Gridiron football

American football

National Football League

Individual

College football

Mexico
ONEFA/CONADEIP (National College Association of American Football/National College Sports Commission of Private Institutions)
 Clásico Estudiantil (Student Derby): Pumas Dorados de la UNAM vs Águilas Blancas del IPN
 Clásico Estudiantil Regiomontano (Monterrey's Student Derby): Borregos Salvajes ITESM vs Auténticos Tigres

United States

Canada
 Panda Game: University of Ottawa Gee-Gees versus Carleton University Ravens
 Shrum Bowl : University of British Columbia  Thunderbirds  versus Simon Fraser University Clan

Canadian football

Gymnastics

Handball

Austria 
 Bregenz derby: Bregenz Handball vs. Alpla HC Hard

Belarus 
 Minsk derbies: Dinamo Minsk vs. SKA Minsk vs. Arkatron Minsk

Belgium 
 Liège derbies:
 ROC Flémalle vs. Union Beynoise
 ROC Flémalle   vs. Jeunesse Jemeppe (previously vs. Progrès HC Seraing).
 Union Beynoise   vs. HC Herstal.
 JS Herstal   vs. HC Herstal.
 Union Beynoise vs. HC Visé BM.
 Germanophone derby : HC Eynatten-Raeren vs. KTSV Eupen 1889
 Limburg derbies: HB Sint-Truiden vs. Initia HC Hasselt vs. United HC Tongeren vs. Achilles Bocholt vs. Sporting Neerpelt-Lommel vs. Kreasa HB Houthalen vs. DHC Meeuwen.
 Antwerp derbies: KV Sasja HC Hoboken vs. Olse Merksem HC vs. DHW Antwerpen vs. HV Uilenspiegel Wilrijk.
 Hainuyé derby: EHC Tournai vs. Entente du Centre CLH
 Flanders derby: HC DB Gent vs. HKW Waasmunster
 Brussels derby: HC Kraainem vs. United Brussels HC
 Charleroi derby: SHC Mont-sur-Marchienne vs. HBC Charleroi-Ransart

Croatia 
 Zagreb derbies:
 RK Dubrava Zagreb vs. RK Medveščak Zagreb
 Zagreb vs. RK Medveščak Zagreb
 RK Dubrava Zagreb vs. Zagreb

Denmark 
 Copenhagen derbies: FC Copenhagen vs. AG København vs. KIF Kolding Copenhagen vs. Ajax Copenhagen

France 
 Val-de-Marne derby: US Créteil vs. US Ivry
 Languedoc derby: Montpellier HB vs. USAM Nîmes

Germany 
 Central Hesse derby: TV Hüttenberg vs. HSG Wetzlar
 Ostderby: SC Magdeburg vs. Füchse Berlin
 Schleswig-Holstein derbies:
 THW Kiel vs. SG Flensburg-Handewitt
 GWD Minden vs. TuS Nettelstedt-Lübbecke
 Nordderby:
 SG Flensburg-Handewitt vs. HSV Hamburg
 THW Kiel vs. HSV Hamburg

Israel 
 Rishon LeZion derby: Hapoel Rishon LeZion vs. Maccabi Rishon LeZion

Hungary 
 Hungarian derby: Veszprém vs. Szeged
 Ferencváros vs. Győri ETO

North Macedonia 
 Skopje derby: RK Metalurg Skopje   vs. Vardar

Poland 
Lomza Vive Kielce vs. Orlen Wisla Plock

Portugal 
 Derby de Lisboa: Sporting CP vs. Benfica

Romania 
 Steaua București vs. Dinamo București

Russia 
 Moscow : CSKA Moscow vs. MAI Moscow

Serbia 
 Belgrade derby: Red Star vs. Partizan

Slovenia 
 Styrian derby: RK Maribor Branik vs. RK Celje Pivovarna Laško or RK Trimo Trebnje vs. RK Jeruzalem Ormož

Spain 
 Catalan derby: Barcelona vs. Granollers

Sweden 
 Gothenburg region derby: Redbergslid vs. Sävehof
 Ystad derby: IFK Ystad vs. Ystads IF

Ukraine 
 Zaporizhzhia derby: HC ZTR Zaporizhzhia vs. HC Motor Zaporizhzhia

Horse racing

Ice hockey

Multinational

Kontinental Hockey League

North America

National Hockey League

ECHL 
 Fort Wayne Komets vs. Indy Fuel

Junior
 Fairbanks Ice Dogs (NAHL) vs. Wenatchee Wild (BCHL)

Canadian Hockey League
 Brandon Wheat Kings vs. Winnipeg Ice (WHL)
 Calgary Hitmen vs. Edmonton Oil Kings (WHL)
 Cape Breton Eagles vs. Halifax Mooseheads (QMJHL)
 Everett Silvertips vs. Seattle Thunderbirds (WHL)
 Flint Firebirds vs. Saginaw Spirit (OHL)
 Guelph Storm vs. Kitchener Rangers (OHL)
 Kamloops Blazers vs. Kelowna Rockets (WHL)
 Kelowna Rockets vs. Portland Winterhawks (WHL)
 Kitchener Rangers vs. London Knights (OHL)
 Lethbridge Hurricanes vs. Medicine Hat Tigers (WHL)
 London Knights vs. Windsor Spitfires (OHL)
 Moncton Wildcats vs. Saint John Sea Dogs (QMJHL)
 Moose Jaw Warriors vs. Swift Current Broncos (WHL)
 Niagara IceDogs vs. Hamilton Bulldogs (OHL)
 Niagara IceDogs vs. Oshawa Generals (OHL)
 Niagara IceDogs vs. Barrie Colts (OHL)
 Niagara IceDogs vs. North Bay Battalion (OHL)
 Niagara IceDogs vs. Mississauga Steelheads (OHL)
 Oshawa Generals vs. Peterborough Petes (OHL)
 Prince Albert Raiders vs. Saskatoon Blades (WHL)
 Regina Pats vs. Moose Jaw Warriors (WHL)
 Quebec Remparts vs. Rimouski Oceanic (QMJHL)
 Sarnia Sting vs. Windsor Spitfires (OHL)
 Saskatoon Blades vs. Regina Pats (WHL)
 Sault Ste. Marie Greyhounds vs. Sudbury Wolves (OHL)
 Tri-City Americans vs. Spokane Chiefs (WHL)
 Vancouver Giants vs. Victoria Royals (WHL)

College

 Air Force vs. Army
 Alaska vs. Alaska–Anchorage
 Battle for Pikes Peak: Air Force vs. Colorado College
 Battle for the Gold Pan: Colorado College vs. Denver
 Battle of Whitney Avenue: Quinnipiac vs. Yale
 BU-Maine Rivalry: Boston University vs. Maine
 Border Battle: Maine vs. New Hampshire
 Clarkson vs. St. Lawrence
 Cornell–Harvard rivalry: Cornell vs. Harvard
 Dartmouth–New Hampshire rivalry: Dartmouth vs. New Hampshire
 Green Line Rivalry: Boston College vs. Boston University
 Harvard–Yale rivalry: Harvard vs. Yale
 Holy War on Ice: Boston College vs. Notre Dame
 Michigan vs. Michigan State
 Michigan vs. Notre Dame
 Michigan vs. Ohio State
 Michigan Tech vs. Northern Michigan
 Minnesota vs. Wisconsin
 RPI vs. Union

Europe

Austria 
 Carinthian Derby: Klagenfurter AC vs. Villacher SV

Czech Republic 
 Prague derby: Slavia Prague vs. Sparta Prague
 LHK Jestřábi Prostějov vs. AZ Havířov
 LHK Jestřábi Prostějov vs. Zubr Přerov
 LHK Jestřábi Prostějov vs. Draci Šumperk
 HC Olomouc vs. LHK Jestřábi Prostějov
 HC Pardubice vs. HC Hradec Králové
 HC Poruba vs. Zubr Přerov
 HC Vítkovice vs. Oceláři Třinec
 Sparta Prague vs. Rytíři Kladno
 VHK Vsetín vs. Berani Zlín

Finland 
 Satakunnan derby: Ässät Pori vs. Lukko Rauma
 Talviklassikko: HIFK Helsinki vs. Helsinki Jokerit
 Tampereen derby: Tampere Ilves vs. Tampere Tappara
 Savon derby: KalPa vs. Jukurit
 Kasitien derby: Ässät, TPS, Sport and Lukko
 Järvi-Suomen derby: KalPa vs. JYP

France 
 Gothiques d'Amiens vs. Dragons de Rouen
 Brûleurs de Loups vs. Ours de Villard-de-Lans
 Diables Rouges de Briançon vs. Rapaces de Gap

Germany
 Düsseldorfer EG vs. Kölner Haie vs. Krefeld Pinguine
 Löwen Frankfurt vs. Kassel Huskies
 ERC Ingolstadt vs. Augsburger Panther

Italy 
 Hockey Club Torino vs. Hockey Club Valpellice

Norway 
 Vålerenga vs. Stavanger Oilers
 Østfold-derby: Stjernen vs. Sparta Warriors
 Mjøs-derby: Storhamar vs. Lillehammer IK
 Oslo-derby: Vålerenga vs. Furuset
 Klassikern: Vålerenga vs. Storhamar

Poland

Romania
 Steaua București vs. Sport Club Miercurea Ciuc

Slovakia 
 HKm Zvolen vs. MsHK Zilina
 MsHK Žilina vs. MHC Martin

Sweden
 Stockholm derby – AIK vs. Hammarby IF vs. Djurgårdens IF
 Western derby – Färjestad vs. Frölunda
 Daladerby: Leksands IF vs. Mora IK
 Southwest derby: Rögle BK vs. Malmö Redhawks
 Västerbotten derby: IF Björklöven vs. Skellefteå AIK
 Timrå IK vs. IF Sundsvall

Switzerland 
 Derby of Switzerland – HC Davos vs. EHC Kloten
 Ticino derby: HC Lugano vs. HC Ambri-Piotta
 Zähringen derby: HC Fribourg-Gottéron vs. SC Bern
 Zuricher derby: Kloten Flyers vs. ZSC Lions
 Berner derby : SC Bern vs. EHC Biel
 Gotthard derby: EV Zug vs. HC Ambri-Piotta
 Zürisee derby: ZSC Lions vs. Rapperswil-Jona Lakers
 Romandy derby: HC Fribourg-Gottéron vs. Servette Geneva
 Bündner derby: EHC Arosa vs. EHC Chur vs. HC Davos
 Lemanic derby: Servette Geneva vs. Lausanne HC
 Valais derby: HC Sierre-Anniviers vs. EHC Visp

United Kingdom

International

Individual

Lacrosse

Luge

Martial arts

Lethwei

Mixed martial arts

Judo

Sumo

Motorsport

Manufacturers, cars, teams

Drivers and riders

Mountaineering and rock climbing

Netball

Rugby league

Australia

National Rugby League

State of Origin

United Kingdom

International Rugby League

Individual

Rugby union

Club Rugby Union

Australia

Argentina

Costa Rica

France

Ireland

Italy

Spain

New Zealand

Poland

United Kingdom

International Rugby Union

Sailing

Short track speed skating

Skiing

Alpine skiing

Biathlon

Cross-country skiing

Ski jumping

Motorcycle Speedway

Poland

Scotland
 Scottish Speedway Derby: Edinburgh Monarchs vs. Glasgow Tigers

Surfing

Swimming

Tennis

Volleyball
 Misurata derby: Al-Sweihli vs. Al-Etihad Misurata
 F2 Logistics Cargo Movers vs. Petron Blaze Spikers
 Bộ Tư lệnh Thông tin - FLC vs. VTV Bình Điền Long An
 V-Classic match: Daejeon Samsung Fire Bluefangs vs. Cheonan Hyundai Capital Skywalkers

See also
 Nationalism and sport
 Politics and sports
 Sociology of sport

References

Works cited

External links
 CBS Sports Line's "7 Seven Rules for the Rivalry-Challenged"
 RedSoxvYankees.com – Yankees-Red Sox Baseball Rivalry
 The Best Rivalry – The Yankees/Red Sox Rivalry

 
Rivalries
Rivalries